Puya hromadnikii is a species of the genus Puya.

References

 Rauh, Trop. Subtrop. Pflanzenwelt. 41: 5–9. 1983. J. Bromeliad Soc. 52: 69–71. 1982.
 The Plant List entry
 Encyclopedia of Life entry
 eFlora Bolivia Checklist entry

hromadnikii